Marianna Sotirianos Kambouroglou (1819-1890), was a Greek folklorist.

Life

She was born August 12, 1819 in Athens.

Mariana Kambouroglou preserved the history of earlier eras and conserved their traditions, which doubtless would have been lost without her efforts. She was one of the more active representatives of the old Athenian life and of its families.

She wrote many notable monographs concerning Athens, and concerning  historical and topographical questions. They were notable for their uncommonly descriptive prose and their reasoning.

She died in Athens on 21 February, 1890.

Publications
She published many ethnographic articles in periodicals of the era, in Byro, Bulletin of the Ethnological and Historical Society of Greece, and Weekly, among others.

Sources 
 
 

1819 births
1890 deaths
19th-century Greek people
Greek folklorists
19th-century Greek women writers
Writers from Athens